Crossocheilus atrilimes is a species of freshwater fish in the family Cyprinidae. It is found in Laos, in Thailand, and in Cambodia.

References

Cyprinid fish of Asia
Fish of Thailand
Fish described in 2000
Crossocheilus